Trochochlamys is a genus of very small air-breathing land snails, terrestrial pulmonate gastropod mollusks in the family Chronidae.

Species 
Species within the genus Trochochlamys include:
 Trochochlamys acutangula (A. Adams, 1868)
 Trochochlamys borealis (Pilsbry, 1901)
 Trochochlamys crenulata (Gude, 1900)
 Trochochlamys fraterna (Pilsbry, 1900)
 Trochochlamys humiliconus (Pilsbry & Hirase, 1904)
 Trochochlamys kiiensis (Azuma, 1960)
 Trochochlamys labilis (Gould, 1859)
 Trochochlamys lioconus (Pilsbry & Hirase, 1905)
 Trochochlamys lioderma (Pilsbry, 1901)
 Trochochlamys longa (Pilsbry & Hirase, 1905)
 Trochochlamys longissima (Pilsbry & Hirase, 1909)
 Trochochlamys monticola Kuroda & Abe, 1980
 Trochochlamys nesiotica (Pilsbry & Hirase, 1903)
 Trochochlamys ogasawarana  (Pilsbry, 1902)
 Trochochlamys okiensis (Pilsbry & Hirase, 1908)
 Trochochlamys okinoshimana (Pilsbry & Hirase, 1904)
 Trochochlamys settuensis Y. Azuma & M. Azuma, 1994
 Trochochlamys sororcula (Pilsbry & Y. Hirase, 1904)
 Trochochlamys subcrenulata (Pilsbry, 1901)
 Trochochlamys tanzawaensis Sorita & Kawana, 1983
 Trochochlamys xenica (Pilsbry & Hirase, 1903)
Species brought into synonymy
 Trochochlamys praealta (Pilsbry, 1902): synonym of Coneuplecta praealta (Pilsbry, 1902) (unaccepted combination)

References

 Bank, R. (2017). Classification of the Recent terrestrial Gastropoda of the World. Last update: July 16, 2017

 Taxonomicon info

 
Euconulidae
Taxonomy articles created by Polbot